LaVergne is one of three stations on Metra's BNSF Line located in Berwyn, Illinois. In Metra's zone-based fare system, LaVergne is in zone B. As of 2018, LaVergne is the 167th busiest of Metra's 236 non-downtown stations, with an average of 174 weekday boardings. It is just west of the large BNSF Cicero Yard and the Canadian National's (former Illinois Central Railroad) Freeport Subdivision.

Bus connections
Pace

References

External links 

Station from Ridgeland Avenue from Google Maps Street View

Berwyn, Illinois
Metra stations in Illinois
Former Chicago, Burlington and Quincy Railroad stations
Railway stations in Cook County, Illinois